Sir Charles Petrie, 1st Baronet DL (1853 – 8 July 1920) was a Scottish businessman and local politician, Lord Mayor of Liverpool in 1901–2.

Life
Petrie was born near Newburgh, Fife, the son of Alexander Petrie of Carrowcarden, and went into the family fishery business; from 1855 his father was based in Sligo, Ireland, with a fishery on the River Moy, which Petrie joined after education at Wesley College, Dublin. In 1876 he set up on his own in Manchester, subsequently moving to Liverpool.

Petrie had salmon fisheries in Scotland and Ireland, and oyster fisheries in Ireland, at Fleetwood, and in Essex. He was leader of the Liverpool Conservatives, knighted in 1903 after his term as Lord Mayor, and created a baronet in 1918.
He was a Deputy Lieutenant of Lancashire.

Family
Sir Edward Petrie, 2nd Baronet and Sir Charles Petrie, 3rd Baronet were the sons of Petrie and his wife Hannah.

Arms

Notes

1853 births
1920 deaths
Scottish businesspeople
Mayors of Liverpool
Baronets in the Baronetage of the United Kingdom
Deputy Lieutenants of Lancashire
People educated at Wesley College, Dublin